Chegongzhuang Station is an interchange station on Line 2 and Line 6 of the Beijing Subway. The station is on intersection of Chegongzhuang street and the West 2nd Ring Road. It provides direct access to Guanyuan Park.

Station Layout 
Both the line 2 and 6 stations have underground island platforms. Line 6 has a split island platform, whilst line 2 has a normal island platform.

Exits 
There are 5 exits, lettered A, B, C, E, and H. Exits C and H are accessible.

Gallery

Notes

Railway stations in China opened in 1984
Beijing Subway stations in Xicheng District